Christopher John Little was an English literary agent. He was born in York in 1941, and grew up in Liversedge. He began a recruitment agency in the 1970s, when looking for work in the United Kingdom after returning from a financial career abroad. He sold his first novel in 1979: the book Man on Fire, written by his friend, Phillip Nicholson, and published under the pseudonym  A. J. Quinnell. Little then established the Christopher Little Literary Agency. Though he considered it only a hobby at first, the recruitment firm grew, and represented 20 authors by the time he sold it in 1992.

Little died from cancer on 7 January 2021, at age 79.

References

1941 births
2021 deaths
People from Liversedge
People from York
Literary agents